The River Boyne ( or Abhainn na Bóinne) is a river in Leinster, Ireland, the course of which is about  long. It rises at Trinity Well, Newberry Hall, near Carbury, County Kildare, and flows towards the Northeast through County Meath to reach the Irish Sea between Mornington, County Meath, and Baltray, County Louth.

Names and etymology 
This river has been known since ancient times. During the High Middle Ages, Giraldus Cambrensis called it the Boandus. In Irish mythology it is said that the river was created by the goddess Boann and Boyne is an anglicised form of the name. In other legends, it was in this river where Fionn mac Cumhail captured Fiontán, the Salmon of Knowledge. The Meath section of the Boyne was also known as Smior Fionn Feidhlimthe (the 'marrow of Fionn Feilim'). The tidal estuary of the Boyne, which extends inland as far as the confluence with the Mattock River, 'the curly hole', had a number of names in Irish literature and was associated as a place of departure and arrival in the ancient legends and myths, such as The Tragedy of the Sons of Tuireann, Togail Bruidne Dá Derga, &c. In the Acallam na Senórach the estuary has the name Inber Bic Loingsigh, abounding in ships. Inber Colpa or Inber Colptha was the principal name for the mouth of the Boyne in early medieval times. The townlands and civil parish of Colp, or Colpe on its southern shore preserve the name. It was associated in myth with Colpa of the Sword, a son of Míl Espáine, in the Milesian origin of the Irish, who drowned in the attempt to land there and is by tradition buried in the ringfort behind Colpe church. An alternative Dindsenchas tradition associates the name with the Máta, a massive aquatic creature, which having been killed was dismembered at Brú na Bóinne was thrown in the Boyne. Its shinbone (colptha) reached the estuary giving name to Inber Colptha.

Course and geography 
The Boyne is lowland river, which is surrounded by the Boyne Valley. It is crossed just west of Drogheda by the Mary McAleese Boyne Valley Bridge, which carries the M1 motorway, and by the Boyne Viaduct, which carries the Dublin-Belfast railway line to the east. The catchment area of the River Boyne is 2,695 km2.

Significance
Despite its short course, the Boyne has historical, archaeological and mythical connotations. The Battle of the Boyne, a major battle in Irish history, took place along the Boyne near Drogheda in 1690 during the Williamite war in Ireland. It passes through the ancient town of Trim, Trim Castle, the Hill of Tara (the ancient capital of the High King of Ireland), Navan, the Hill of Slane, Brú na Bóinne (a complex of megalithic monuments), Mellifont Abbey, and the medieval town of Drogheda. In the Boyne Valley can also be found other historical and archaeological monuments, including Loughcrew, Kells, Celtic crosses, and castles.

History

Boyne Canal 

The Boyne Navigation is a series of canals running roughly parallel to the main river from Oldbridge near Drogheda to Navan. Owned by An Taisce and mostly derelict, the Inland Waterways Association of Ireland are restoring the navigation to navigable status. The canal at Oldbridge which runs through the battle of the Boyne Site was the first to be restored.

Prehistoric art 
A rock with indications of being Prehistoric art was found in August 2013.  Cliadh O’Gibne reported through the Archaeological Survey of Ireland that a boulder with geometric carvings had been found in Donore, County Meath.

Ancient log-boat 
The Boyne Fishermen's Rescue and Recovery Service (BFRRS), near Drogheda, County Louth, were doing one of their regular operations to remove shopping trolleys from the Boyne, in May 2013, when they discovered an ancient log boat, which experts believe may be 5000 years old. Initial examination by an underwater archaeologist, suggests it could be very rare because, unlike other log-boats found here, it has oval shapes on the upper edge which could have held oars. Investigations were on-going as of 2013.

Viking ship 
In 2006, the remains of a Viking ship were found in the river bed in Drogheda during dredging operations. The vessel is to be excavated as it poses a hazard to navigation.

Annalistic references

 AI770.2 The battle of Bolg Bóinne [gained] against the Uí Néill, by the Laigin.

Flora and fauna 
Various species of trout inhabit the Boyne, namely brook trout, brown trout and introduced rainbow trout. There is also a steelhead in the spring and naturally reproducing salmon in the fall.

Gallery

See also
 
 Anthony Holten, author of The River Boyne: Hidden Legacies, History and Lore Explored on Foot and by Boat

References

External links

Salmon fishing on the River Boyne, from Salmon Ireland
A canoeing and kayaking guide to the River Boyne, from Irish Whitewater

Boyne
Boyne
Boyne
Tourist attractions in County Meath
Drogheda